The Reverend George B. Hitchcock House is a historic house museum in Cass County, Iowa, near the city of Lewis.  Built in 1856 by the Congregationalist minister George B. Hitchcock, it has features indicative of its use as a "station" on the Underground Railway, corroborated by documentary evidence of Hitchcock's involvement in the shelter and transport of escaped slaves.  It was declared a National Historic Landmark in 2006. It now houses a museum.

Description and history
The Hitchcock House is located west of the city limits of Lewis, on a hill overlooking the western bank of the East Nishnabotna River. It is a two-story structure, built out of locally sourced random ashlar sandstone, and resting on a rubblestone foundation. Stylistically it is a vernacular interpretation of Federal period architecture. Unusual features of its interior include an apparently purpose-built basement chamber, whose access was probably concealed by a false cabinet. The other basement room is fitted with a cooking fireplace, and was accessible via an exterior entrance and by stairs from above. It is surmised that these rooms were used for the shelter and support of fugitive slaves.

The minister George B. Hitchcock (1812–1872) built the house around 1855 and lived in it from 1856 to 1865. At the time of its construction, it overlooked two major east–west trails, leading to ferry crossings on the river. Hitchcock was involved in the American abolitionism movement known as the Underground Railroad, giving sanctuary to escaped slaves. The property was used as a farm until 1966, when it was sold to the state. It underwent a major restoration in the 1980s, and is now managed by the county as a historic house museum, interpreting the history of the Hitchcock family and the Underground Railroad.

See also
List of Underground Railroad sites
List of National Historic Landmarks in Iowa
National Register of Historic Places listings in Cass County, Iowa

References

External links

Hitchcock House web site

National Historic Landmarks in Iowa
Houses on the National Register of Historic Places in Iowa
National Register of Historic Places in Cass County, Iowa
Museums in Cass County, Iowa
Houses completed in 1855
Houses on the Underground Railroad
Underground Railroad in Iowa
Historic house museums in Iowa
Houses in Cass County, Iowa